Payaguá (Payawá) is an extinct language of Paraguay, Argentina, and Bolivia, spoken by the Payaguá Indians.  It is usually classified as one of the Guaicuruan languages, but the data is insufficient to demonstrate that.

Classification
Viegas Barros (2004) proposes that Payagua may be a Macro-Guaicurúan language. However, Campbell (2012) classifies Payagua as a language isolate.

An automated computational analysis (ASJP 4) by Müller et al. (2013) found lexical similarities between Payagua and the Chonan languages. However, since the analysis was automatically generated, the grouping could be either due to mutual lexical borrowing, genetic inheritance, or chance resemblances.

Sources
Boggiani, G. (1900). Lingüística sudamericana: Datos para el estudio de los idiomas Payagua y Machicui. Trabajos de la 4a sección del Congreso Científico Latinoamericano, 203-282. Buenos Aires: Compañía Sud-Americana de Billetes de Banco.
Schmidt, M. (1949). Los Payaguá. Revista do Museu Paulista N.S., 3:129-317.

Notes

References

 
 

Languages of Argentina
Guaicuruan languages
Extinct languages of South America
Languages extinct in the 1900s
Language isolates of South America
Chaco linguistic area